RS Productions was an Australian television and radio production company best known for producing the 1980-1984 sitcom Kingswood Country. The company was founded by Gary Reilly and Tony Sattler, originally to produce comic sketches such as The Novels of Fiona Wintergreen and "anti-ads" (satirical advertisements for fictitious company Product Name) for ABC youth radio 2JJ and for its "Local Radio" network. Titles included Chuck Chunder of the Space Patrol (1975), Doctors and Nurses (1976) and The Naked Vicar Show (1976–77), for which a compilation of highlights is available.

A television version of The Naked Vicar Show was broadcast by Channel Seven (1977–78). One of its regular sketches became the basis for the hit series Kingswood Country. Other TV series produced by the company included Daily at Dawn (1981), Brass Monkeys (1984–1985) and "Bullpitt!" (1997–1998). The company also produced several radio programs. Today the company still exists as the copyright holder of its programs, two of which, Kingswood Country and Bullpitt!, have since been released on DVD.

The company ceased production in 1984.

References

See also
Australian television

Television production companies of Australia